The Club Sportif Sfaxien Volleyball Club (often referred to as CSS) is one of CS Sfaxien club's sections that represent the club in Tunisia and international volleyball competitions, the club team based in Sfax.

History 
The Club Sportif Sfaxien is a Tunisian sports team founded in 1928 in Sfax, a popular and successful volleyball region of the country. The club has won the Tunisian Championship 11 times, the Tunisia cup 12 times, seven Arab Championships (record) and six African Club Championships.
It was the first African club to play in the Volleyball Club World Championship in 1989 in Italy.

Current squad 
Squad as of October 16, 2013

Head coach:  Mohamed Ben Mustapha
Assistant coach:  Dragan Svetozarevic

Technical and managerial staff

Honors

National Achievements
Tunisian League :
 Winners (11 titles) : 1978–79, 1981–82, 1983–84, 1984–85, 1985–86, 1986–87, 1987–88, 2003–04, 2004–05, 2008–09, 2012–13
 Runners up (10 times) : 1976–77, 1977–78, 1980–81, 1982–83, 1988–89, 1989–90, 1998–99, 2002–03, 2011–12, 2017–18
Tunisian Cup :
 Winners (12 cups) : 1976–77, 1978–79, 1980–81, 1981–82, 1984–85, 1985–86, 1986–87, 2001–02, 2004–05, 2008–09, 2011–12, 2012–13

Tunisian Supercup :
 Winners (1 Supercup) : 2004–05

Regional Achievements
Arab Clubs Championship :
 Winners (7 titles) : 1983,1985,1991, 1999, 2000, 2008, 2013

International Achievements
African Club Championship :
 Winners (6 titles) : 1985, 1986, 1989, 1999, 2005, 2013

 FIVB Volleyball Men's Club World Championship
5th place : 2013
6th place : 1989

Head coaches
This is a list of the senior team's head coaches in the recent years.

As of 2014

Notable players
Nigeria: Usman Abdallah
 Noureddine Hfaiedh
 Hosni Karamosli
 Chaker Ghezal
 Marouen FehriEurope'''
 Martin Stoev
 Sasa Gadnik

See also
CS Sfaxien
CS Sfaxien Women's Volleyball
CS Sfaxien Women's Basketball

References

External links
 Official website

Tunisian volleyball clubs
Volleyball clubs established in 1928
1928 establishments in Tunisia
Sport in Tunisia